"One Love" is a song by Swedish singers Carola Häggkvist & Andreas Johnson. It was their Melodifestivalen 2008 entry, but failed in "Andra Chansen", the Second Chance round. The single reached number 11 on the Swedish Singles Chart.

Release history

External links
"One Love" at the Swedish singles chart

2008 singles
Melodifestivalen songs of 2008
Andreas Johnson songs
Male–female vocal duets
Songs written by Andreas Johnson
2008 songs
Warner Music Group singles
Songs written by Peter Kvint
Songs written by Carola Häggkvist